Hernán Márquez Beltrán (born September 4, 1988), commonly known by his nickname "Tyson" Márquez, is a Mexican professional boxer. He held the WBA flyweight title from 2011 to 2012, and has challenged once for the WBA interim super flyweight title in 2010. Márquez is known for his trilogy of fights against Luis Concepción whom he defeated twice in 2011 and lost to in 2015.

Professional career

Nicknamed "Tyson" due to his aggressive style, Márquez is a hard-hitting southpaw.

Márquez began his professional career on October 21, 2005, with a unanimous decision win over Noe Acosta. On July 25, 2009, he also won the WBC USNBC title with a unanimous decision win against Juan Escuer. Márquez won his following two fights before losing to Richie Mepranum by a 10-round unanimous decision. In his next fight, he moved up to the super flyweight division in order to challenge Nonito Donaire for the interim WBA super flyweight title. He lost the bout by 8th round knock out.

WBA flyweight champion 

After scoring two consecutive wins, he returned to the Flyweight division and faced WBA world champion Luis Concepción.  Márquez defeated Concepción by 11th round technical knock out to claim the title and become world champion at the age of 22.  In an action filled bout, Márquez rose from a first round knock down to drop the champion later in that same round. He also knocked Concepción down in the third and tenth round before stopping him in the eleventh.

In his first defense, he defeated Edrin Dapudong by third-round knockout.

In his second WBA World Flyweight Title defense he fought Luis Concepcion for the second time in 2011. He stopped Concepcion in round 1 after scoring three knockdowns.

Márquez participated in an International Boxing Federation title eliminator on June 14, 2014, but was dominated and knocked out in eleven rounds by McJoe Arroyo. He was knocked down by the Puerto Rican boxer in the first, fourth, eighth and last rounds.

Professional boxing record

References

External links

1988 births
Living people
Boxers from Sonora
Southpaw boxers
People from Empalme, Sonora
Mexican male boxers
World flyweight boxing champions
Super-flyweight boxers
World Boxing Association champions